Ave Maria International Academy is a private, co-educational Christian Academy (day and boarding school) founded in 2016. The school provides crèche, pre-nursery, nursery, primary and secondary school facilities. Its main Campus is located at East West Road, Port Harcourt, Rivers State, Nigeria.

Departments
The school currently includes the following departments:

Science department
Music department
ICT department
Language department
Phonics department
Vocational department

External links

Schools in Port Harcourt
Boarding schools in Rivers State
Private schools in Rivers State
Co-educational boarding schools
2016 establishments in Nigeria
2000s establishments in Rivers State
Educational institutions established in 2016
Secondary schools in Rivers State